Thripadectes is a genus of Neotropical birds in the ovenbird family Furnariidae.

Taxonomy
The genus was established by Philip Sclater in 1862 with the flammulated treehunter as the type species.

The genus contains seven species:

 Flammulated treehunter, Thripadectes flammulatus
 Striped treehunter, Thripadectes holostictus
 Uniform treehunter, Thripadectes ignobilis
 Black-billed treehunter, Thripadectes melanorhynchus
 Streak-breasted treehunter, Thripadectes rufobrunneus
 Peruvian treehunter, Thripadectes scrutator
 Streak-capped treehunter, Thripadectes virgaticeps

References

 
Bird genera
Taxa named by Philip Sclater
Taxonomy articles created by Polbot